Juanita is a 1935 French musical comedy film directed by Pierre Caron and starring Mireille Perrey, Alfred Rode and André Berley. The following year it was remade in Britain as Gypsy Melody directed by Edmond T. Gréville and starring Lupe Vélez and Alfred Rode.

Partial cast
 Mireille Perrey as  Juanita
 Alfred Rode as Alex Bratlesco  
 André Berley as The King
 Alice Tisson as The Queen
 Milly Mathis as Giuliana 
 Albert Duvaleix as Colonel Bratlesco  
 Nane Germon as Elaine Georgesco

References

Bibliography
 Vogel, Michelle. Lupe Velez: The Life and Career of Hollywood's Mexican Spitfire. McFarland, 2012.

External links

1935 films
French musical comedy films
French black-and-white films
1935 musical comedy films
1930s French-language films
Films directed by Pierre Caron
1930s French films